The following is a list of those who have won the American Society of Cinematographers Award for Outstanding Achievement in Cinematography in Regular Series. The award is given by the American Society of Cinematographers to a regular television series while television movies, miniseries and pilots compete in their own category.

Winners and nominees

1990s

2000s

2010s

2020s

References

American Society of Cinematographers Awards
Awards for best cinematography